Olivola is a comune (municipality) in the Province of Alessandria in the Italian region Piedmont, about  east of Turin and about  northwest of Alessandria. 
Olivola borders the municipalities of Casorzo, Frassinello Monferrato, Ottiglio, and Vignale Monferrato.

References

Cities and towns in Piedmont